The Manora Cantonment is a cantonment town in a small Manora Island, located just south of Karachi, in Sindh, Pakistan. It serves as a military base and residential establishment. It was established by the British Indian Army in 19th-century British India, and taken over by the Pakistan Army in 1947. 

The cantonment maintains its own infrastructure of water supply, electricity and is outside the jurisdiction of City District Government of Karachi.

See also
 Army Cantonment Board, Pakistan
 Cantonment (Pakistan)
 Manora, Karachi
 Manora Island
 Manora Fort, Karachi

References 

Cantonments in Karachi
Coastal cities and towns in Pakistan